"Too Easy" is a song by American rappers Gunna and Future. It was released through YSL Records and 300 Entertainment on September 24, 2021, as the lead single from Gunna's third studio album, DS4Ever (2022). The song was produced by Wheezy and Sean Momberger.

Composition
Jon Blistein of Rolling Stone described the track's production as a "prickly harp loop around crisp drums, big bass hits and a sinister synth". Gunna and Future sing about how they could easily make a hit whenever they collaborate, as well as the "riches and success they've attained in their respective careers".

Remix
The official remix of the song features American rapper Roddy Ricch and was released on December 3, 2021. The remix later appeared on the album alongside the original as a bonus track.

Charts

Weekly charts

Year-end charts

Certifications

References

2021 singles
2021 songs
Gunna (rapper) songs
Future (rapper) songs
300 Entertainment singles
Song recordings produced by Wheezy (record producer)
Songs written by Gunna (rapper)
Songs written by Future (rapper)
Songs written by Wheezy (record producer)